This is the progression of world record improvements of the long jump M70 division of Masters athletics.

Key

IAAF includes indoor marks in the record list since 2000, but WMA does not follow that practice.

References

Masters Athletics Long Jump list

Masters athletics world record progressions
Long